I Will is the fifth Korean language studio album by the South Korean pop-rock band F.T. Island, released by FNC Entertainment on 23 March 2015. The music video for the title song Pray was released on the same date, produced by ZanyBros. The band's Japanese song "To the Light" from the album was first made available in Korean.

Track listing

References

F.T. Island albums
2015 albums
Korean-language albums
FNC Entertainment albums